Lee Dong-hyun (Hangul: 이동현) (born January 12, 1983 in Ulsan, South Korea) is a South Korean relief pitcher who plays for the LG Twins in the Korea Baseball Organization.

Amateur career
Lee attended Kyunggi High School in Seoul, South Korea.

External links 
 Profile and stats on the KBO official website

1983 births
Living people
South Korean baseball players
LG Twins players
Sportspeople from Ulsan
KBO League pitchers
21st-century South Korean people